Gudå Station is a railway station on the Meråker Line at the village of Gudå in the municipality of Meråker in Trøndelag county, Norway.  The station was opened on 17 October 1881 as Gudaa. It was renamed Gudaaen in 1894, and received the current name in April 1924.

The station has been unmanned since 1 February 1982. It is served twice a day in each direction by SJ Norge. The station is owned by Bane NOR.

References

Railway stations in Meråker
Railway stations on the Meråker Line
Railway stations opened in 1881
1881 establishments in Norway